Tavazzano is a railway station in Italy. Located on the Milan–Bologna railway, it serves the municipality of Tavazzano con Villavesco.

Services
Tavazzano is served by line S1 of the Milan suburban railway network, operated by the Lombard railway company Trenord.

See also
 Milan suburban railway network

References

Railway stations in Lombardy
Milan S Lines stations
Railway stations opened in 1861
1861 establishments in Italy
Railway stations in Italy opened in the 19th century